In thermodynamics, the entropy of fusion is the increase in entropy when melting a solid substance. This is almost always positive since the degree of disorder increases in the transition from an organized crystalline solid to the disorganized structure of a liquid; the only known exception is helium.

A natural process such as a phase transition will occur when the associated change in the Gibbs free energy is negative. 

where  is the enthalpy of fusion.
Since this is a thermodynamic equation, the symbol  refers to the absolute thermodynamic temperature, measured in kelvins (K).
 
Equilibrium occurs when the temperature is equal to the melting point  so that 

and the entropy of fusion is the heat of fusion divided by the melting point:

Helium
Helium-3 has a negative entropy of fusion at temperatures below 0.3 K. Helium-4 also has a very slightly negative entropy of fusion below 0.8 K. This means that, at appropriate constant pressures, these substances freeze with the addition of heat.

See also
Entropy of vaporization

Notes

References

Thermodynamic entropy
Thermodynamic properties